Linda is a village in Abkhazia, Georgia.

The village was established by Estonians in 19th century. As of 2002, 0 dwellers live in village.

See also
Alam-Linda

References

Populated places in Sukhumi District
Estonian diaspora